The 2003 Waterford Senior Hurling Championship was the 103rd staging of the Waterford Senior Hurling Championship since its establishment by the Waterford County Board in 1897. The championship began on 15 August 2003 and ended on 9 November 2003.

Mount Sion were the defending champions.

On 9 November 2003, Mount Sion won the championship after a 1-14 to 1-10 defeat of Ballygunner in a final replay at Walsh Park. It was their 33rd championship title overall and their second title in succession.

Lismore's Seán Daly was the championship's top scorer with 6-20.

Team changes

To Championship

Promoted from the Waterford Intermediate Hurling Championship
 Ardmore

From Championship

Relegated to the Waterford Intermediate Hurling Championship
 Passage

Results

First round

Second round

Relegation play-offs

Losers' group

Quarter-final

Semi-finals

Final

Championship statistics

Top scorers

Top scorers overall

Top scorers in a single game

References

Waterford
Waterford Senior Hurling Championship